TABC can refer to:
 Texas Alcoholic Beverage Commission
 TABC, Inc., a Toyota Motor Company factory in Long Beach, California
 Torah Academy of Bergen County, a school in Teaneck, New Jersey
 Transatlantic Business Council, a business advocacy group on transatlantic trade